Andrew Malcolm (4 May 1933 – 26 December 2013) was an English professional footballer who played as a wing-half in the Football League for West Ham United, Chelsea and Queens Park Rangers.

Career
The son of a train driver, Malcolm was born above a grocery in Upton Park, a short distance from the Boleyn Ground. He joined West Ham United in 1948 from Dury Falls Secondary School in Hornchurch, and worked in the club office as well as playing. With experience of international football as captain of England Schoolboys, he became the first West Ham player to represent England Youth in April 1948 when he played all three games of the International Youth Football Association Tournament, which ended with England beating Netherlands in the Final.

Malcolm made his Eastern Counties League debut for the West Ham 'A' team in January 1949. He signed professional forms with the club in July 1950 and received a £10 signing on fee. His debut in the Football Combination came the following month, and he played his first London Midweek League fixture in October.

After nearly 100 reserve appearances, Malcolm made his senior debut in October 1953, an Essex Professional Cup encounter against Colchester United at Layer Road that the hosts won 5–1. He made his Second Division debut on 5 December against Notts County, another loss. He made 14 League appearances that season, replacing Derek Parker in a team that finished 13th. His three FA Cup appearances included a home tie against Blackpool on 30 January 1954, the day after his father had died. The game ended 1–1, and West Ham lost the replay after Malcolm pulled a thigh muscle.

Malcolm's first full season, 1954–55, saw 38 League appearances. He played 22 League games in 1955–56, and was also part of the team that narrowly missed out on an FA Cup semi-final after losing a sixth-round replay against Tottenham Hotspur. In 1956–57, he made 37 League appearances.

Malcolm was a member of the team that gained Ted Fenton's West Ham promotion as champions of the Second Division in 1957–58. He played in every league game of the campaign, the only player to do so, and scored his first three goals for the club. The season also saw the first award of the 'Hammer of the Year' title and Malcolm became the first player to receive the accolade after being nominated by a journalist at The Stratford Express (subsequent recipients would be awarded the title after a vote by supporters).

The following season, 1958–59, saw a sixth-place finish in the First Division, with Malcolm again an ever-present. He gained a winners medal in the Essex Professional Cup after playing in the final, against Leyton Orient.

In October 1958, Malcolm, along with teammate John Bond, represented the Football League against the Scottish League.

On 16 January 1960, Malcolm's run of 110 consecutive League appearances came to an end. On 5 November 1960, he scored his fourth and final goal for West Ham in a 6–0 drubbing of Arsenal. His final appearance in claret and blue would come on 28 October 1961, a 2–3 loss to Sheffield Wednesday at Upton Park.

Finding that there was no room for his style of play under Ron Greenwood, Malcolm left Hammers after 283 league appearances, one season away from qualifying for a testimonial match. He joined Chelsea in return for £10,000 and centre-forward Ron Tindall in part exchange.

Malcolm made his debut in a struggling Chelsea side on 4 November 1961. He was named captain six games later, taking over duties from Frank Blunstone. He made 27 League appearances for the club, his only goal coming against west London rivals Fulham on 13 January 1962, but was unable to prevent Chelsea's relegation to the Second Division at the end of the 1961–62 season. A dispute with manager Tommy Docherty saw Malcolm hand in a transfer request. This was declined, but a move to Third Division club Queens Park Rangers for £10,000 was to come in October 1962. He made 84 League appearances for QPR under Alec Stock, although an eye injury threatened to end his career in 1964–65.

After leaving QPR in 1965, Malcolm moved to South Africa where he played for two seasons in Port Elizabeth, for Port Elizabeth City and then the Greek side Westview Apollon.

Upon his return to England, Malcolm played for Southern League club Brentwood Town for the 1967–68 season.

Style of play
Malcolm is described in the Who's Who of West Ham United thus:

An obituary in The Independent concurred:

After football

After his retirement from football, Malcolm worked at ice cream company Lyons and then became a publican. From 1968, he was landlord of The Ship and Anchor in Maldon, Essex and The Lion in Latchingdon, Essex, and played Sunday league football with some of his customers. In 1986, he emigrated to Port Elizabeth, South Africa.

Malcolm died at his home in Port Elizabeth on 26 December 2013. West Ham club anthem "I'm Forever Blowing Bubbles" played at his funeral.

Career statistics

Honours
West Ham United
 Second Division winner: 1957–58
 Football Combination Cup winner: 1953–54
 Essex Professional Cup winner: 1958–59
 Southern Floodlight Cup runner-up: 1959–60

Individual
 Hammer of the Year: 1958

References

1933 births
2013 deaths
Footballers from Upton Park, London
English footballers
England youth international footballers
Association football wing halves
West Ham United F.C. players
Chelsea F.C. players
Queens Park Rangers F.C. players
Brentwood Town F.C. players
Expatriate soccer players in South Africa
English emigrants to South Africa
English Football League players
English Football League representative players
Southern Football League players
Port Elizabeth City F.C. players
Publicans